(born 1952) is a Japanese acoustician, who has been chief acoustician for over 50 projects worldwide, including the Walt Disney Concert Hall, Suntory Hall in Tokyo, the Bard College Performing Arts Center in New York, the Elbphilharmonie in Hamburg, and the Kauffman Center for the Performing Arts in Kansas City. He is the company director and U.S. Representative of Nagata Acoustics of Tokyo.

Toyota was born and raised in Fukuyama, Hiroshima Prefecture and graduated from the Kyushu Institute of Design in 1972. He has been employed by Nagata Acoustics since 1977.

His works have included the Shenzhen Cultural Center Concert Hall for the People's Republic of China, Finland's Helsinki Music Centre, the Danish Radio Concert Hall in Copenhagen, Polish National Radio Symphony Orchestra in Katowice, the Bing Concert Hall at Stanford University, the Elbe Philharmonic Hall in Hamburg and the renovation of the Sydney Opera House Concert Hall. He has also worked on Miami Beach's New World Center.

See also
 Acoustical engineering
 Vineyard style (architecture)
 Nagata Acoustics

External links
Time Magazine - "Perfect Pitch," November 16, 2003
Los Angeles Times - "Sculpting the Sound," October 19, 2003
A Conversation with Yasuhisa Toyota - August 22, 2006

Japanese acoustical engineers
Living people
1952 births